Nuttalliella namaqua is a tick found in southern Africa from Tanzania to Namibia and South Africa, which is placed in its own family, Nuttalliellidae. It can be distinguished from ixodid ticks and argasid ticks by a combination of characteristics including the position of the stigmata, lack of setae, strongly corrugated integument, and form of the fenestrated plates. It is the most basal lineage of ticks.

History

Early zoological descriptions 
The first description by G.A.H. Bedford in 1931 was based upon a single female collected under a stone at Kamieskroon, in Little Namaqualand, by Dr R.F. Lawrence in October 1930. The genus and family were named for the bacteriologist George Nuttall, a specialist in diseases transmitted by ticks. As of 1980, only eighteen specimens had been collected. In a 2011 study, that number was increased to fifty-one total specimens. They were collected in three locations in South Africa including two new sites: Springbok, Graaff-Reinet, and Heuningvleipan.

Distribution 
Nuttalliella namaqua has been observed in Tanzania, Namibia and South Africa. Localities of collection include coastal (west and south) and inland sites (north). The Namibia specimens were collected from museum mammal skins in Kuboes. The biomes represented by these locations are: mixed tree and shrub savannah, Nama Karoo and Succulent Karoo. This current geographic range probably resembles the historic range of N. namaqua as the area's climate has remained relatively unchanged since the Permian extinction event when it became semiarid.

Behavior

Hosts 
N. namaqua is believed to be a generalist when choosing a host. N. namaqua has been collected from mammals, reptiles and birds nests. Genetic sequencing of blood found in N. namaqua show a wide diversity of lizard hosts. The estimation for the genus' age supports a generalist host preference. In order to survive for over two-hundred and eighty million years, N. namaqua would need to access a variety of hosts as species became extinct and new species emerged. Due to the age of the genus, N. namaqua most likely switched hosts many times. A study proposed that early Nuttalliellia (~260-270 mya) parasitized therapsids before moving onto diapsids soon after the Permian extinction. Lizards would then have replaced diapsids as primary hosts. Eventually, N. namaqua moved into mammals and birds. However, more recent estimates have suggested a younger date for the split between Nuttalliellidae and all other ticks at around 195 million years ago.

References

Ticks
Acari genera
Monotypic arthropod genera
Arachnids of Africa